Catarina Ligendza (born 18 October 1937) is a Swedish soprano opera singer.

Originally Katarina Beyron, she was born in Stockholm, the daughter of the soprano  and the tenor . She studied at the University of Music and Performing Arts, Vienna, then from 1959 to 1963, at the Hochschule für Musik Würzburg, and finally with Josef Greindl at the Hochschule für Musik Saar.

In 1965 she made her debut as the Countess in Mozart's  Le nozze di Figaro in Linz. Afterwards she sang in Braunschweig and Saarbrücken and then at the Deutsche Oper Berlin in 1969, engagements followed in Stuttgart and Hamburg and in 1971 she took the role of Leonore in Fidelio at the Metropolitan Opera, New York City.

As a dramatic soprano, she was prominent in the Wagner repertoire and appeared at the Bayreuth Festival from 1971-1977 and in 1986 and 1987 as Isolde and as Elsa in 1987. Probably the best known of her recordings is the Meistersinger production of 1976 for Deutsche Grammophon, conducted by Eugen Jochum, in which she sings the role of Eva. She also sang at La Scala, the Royal Opera House in London, in Munich and Vienna. She retired in 1988.

References

Much of the information in this article is taken from «Catarina Ligendza» in the German Wikipedia. The source texts listed below are from the original article:
Lexikon der Interpreten klassischer Musik im 20. Jahrhundert, Bärenreiter-Verlag, Kassel 1992, 
Jens Malte Fischer, Große Stimmen Suhrkamp Verlag 1995

Further reading
 Liese, Kirsten, Wagnerian Heroines. A Century Of Great Isoldes and Brünnhildes, English translation: Charles Scribner, Edition Karo, Berlin, 2013.

External links
Biography: Catarina Ligendza on the official web site of the Wilhelm Stenhammar International Music Competition  
Catarina Ligendza in the Internet Movie Database
Catarina Ligendza in Tristan und Isolde

1937 births
Swedish operatic sopranos
Litteris et Artibus recipients
Living people
University of Music and Performing Arts Vienna alumni
Singers from Stockholm
20th-century Swedish women  opera singers